Irvine Campbell Geddes (9 July 1882 – 18 May 1962) was a Scottish rugby union player.

He also played for London Scottish FC.

He was the father of Keith Geddes, who was also capped for Scotland.

References

Bibliography
 Bath, Richard (ed.) The Scotland Rugby Miscellany (Vision Sports Publishing Ltd, 2007 )
Griffiths, John, The Phoenix Book of International Rugby Records. Phoenix House / J. M. Dent & Sons, London, 1987.  

1882 births
1962 deaths
London Scottish F.C. players
Scotland international rugby union players
Scottish rugby union players